"Somewhere There's a Someone" is a song written by Baker Knight, which was released in 1966 by Dean Martin. The song spent 8 weeks on the Billboard Hot 100 chart, peaking at No. 32, while reaching No. 2 on Billboards Easy Listening chart. In Canada, the song reached No. 44 on the RPM 100, No. 9 on RPMs "GMP Guide", and No. 17 on the CHUM Hit Parade. 

The song was ranked No. 18 on Billboards ranking of "Top Easy Listening Singles" of 1966.

Chart performance

References

1966 singles
1966 songs
Dean Martin songs
Reprise Records singles
Song recordings produced by Jimmy Bowen
Songs written by Baker Knight